BCPS may refer to:

Bangladesh College of Physicians and Surgeons, an institute of medical science in Bangladesh. 
Baltimore City Public Schools, a system of schools administered by the Baltimore City Government.
Baltimore County Public Schools, a system of schools administered by the government of the Baltimore County, Maryland.
Birth control pills (BCPs)
Board Certified Pharmacotherapy Specialist, a pharmacist who has been granted certification by the Board of Pharmaceutical Specialities in the area of Pharmacotherapy.
Botetourt County Public Schools, a system of schools administered by the government of the Botetourt County, Virginia.
Broward County Public Schools, a system of schools administered by the government of the Broward County, Florida.
Buchanan County Public Schools, a system of schools administered by the government of the Buchanan County, Virginia.